Attilio Fresia (5 March 1891 – 14 April 1923) was an Italian footballer who played as a midfielder. He represented the Italy national football team once, appearing on 1 May 1913 in a friendly match against Belgium in a 1–0 home win.

References

1891 births
1923 deaths
Italian footballers
Italy international footballers
Association football midfielders
Torino F.C. players
Genoa C.F.C. players
Modena F.C. players
U.S. Livorno 1915 managers
Modena F.C. managers
Italian football managers